Temnosternus vitulus is a species of beetle in the family Cerambycidae. It was described by Francis Polkinghorne Pascoe in 1871. It is known from Australia.

References

Tmesisternini
Beetles described in 1871